Khadyzhensk is a town in Apsheronsky District of Krasnodar Krai, Russia, located on the Pshish River,  southeast of Krasnodar.

History
It was founded in 1864 as the stanitsa of Khadyzhenskaya. Town status was granted to it in 1949.

Administrative and municipal status
Within the framework of administrative divisions, it is, together with three rural localities, incorporated within Apsheronsky District as the Town of Khadyzhensk. As a municipal division, the Town of Khadyzhensk is incorporated within Apsheronsky Municipal District as Khadyzhenskoye Urban Settlement.

Demographics

References

Sources

External links

Official website of Khadyzhensk 
Khadyzhensk Business Directory 

Cities and towns in Krasnodar Krai
Apsheronsky District
1864 establishments in the Russian Empire